Amalion is a multilingual independent academic publishing house based in Dakar, Senegal.

History
Amalion is an independent pan-African publishing house based in Dakar, created in 2009. Amalion publishes scholarly knowledge from various parts of Africa, and across linguistic boundaries. Amalion’s logo is represented by the head of a lion in a plethora of colors representing the diversity of the African continent.

The first book released by Amalion in June 2009 is a collection of poetry from the Ugandan writer Mildred Kiconco Barya entitled Give Me Room To Move My Feet. Since then, the house has published other works, including A History of the Yoruba People by Stephen Adebanji Akintoye (2010), La dette odieuse de l’Afrique, by Léonce Ndikumana and James Boyce (2013) on the links between debt, capital flight and development in Africa; Wala Bok: Une histoire orale du hip hop au Sénégal, (2015) by Fatou Kandé Senghor on the evolution of rap and the emergence of youth activism in Senegal  and My Life Has a Price, by Tina Okpara (2012), a searing story of freedom from modern slavery.
Amalion also published The Promise of Hope (2014), the last work of the Ghanaian poet Kofi Awoonor, who died in the terrorist attack on Westgate shopping mall in Nairobi in 2013, within the African Poetry Book Series project coordinated by the poet Kwame Dawes. In 2016, the work of the renowned Nigerian historian Mahmud Modibbo Tukur British colonisation of Northern Nigeria, 1897-1914 is released. Amalion is also involved with Jacana Literary Foundation and some publishing houses around Africa in the creation of the new Gerald Kraak Award and Anthology for the promotion of gender and human rights launched in 2016.

Amalion titles cover literary fiction, social sciences, development studies, biographies, arts and politics aimed for academics and the general public.

Published authors
 Mildred Kiconco Barya
 Louis Camara
 Tina Okpara
 Ibrahima Amadou Niang
 Kofi Awoonor
 Clifton Gachagua
 Kevin Eze
 Stephen Adebanji Akintoye
 Anthonia Makwemoisa
 Enyinna Chuta
 Léonce Ndikumana
 :fr:James K. Boyce
 :fr:Jean-Bernard Ouédraogo
 Rotimi Williams Olatunji
 Beatrice Adeyinka Laninhun
 Tope Omoniyi
 :fr:Fatou Kande Senghor
 Mahmud Modibbo Tukur
 Tade Akin Aina
 Bhekinkosi Moyo
 Fabrizio Terenzio
 Antoinette Tidjani Alou
 Akwasi Aidoo

References

2009 establishments in Senegal
Academic publishing companies
Companies of Senegal
Mass media in Senegal